Helga Knapp is an Austrian Paralympic alpine skier. She represented Austria in Paralympic Alpine skiing, at the 1988 Paralympic Winter Games in Innsbruck, and 1992 Paralympic Winter Games in Albertville. She won two medals, one gold and one bronze medal.

Career 
At the 1988 Winter Paralympics in Innsbruck, Austria, Knapp missed the podium, placing 9th in the giant slalom LW2 race (with a time of 2:17.46), 4th in the slalom LW2 in 1:41.65, and 6th in the downhill LW2 (time 1:31.62).

At the 1992 Winter Paralympic Games in Albertville, Knapp won gold in the slalom LW2, with a time of 1:24.49 (silver for Nadine Laurent with 1:25.90 and bronze for Roni Sasaki with 1:26.05), and bronze in the super-G LW2 (behind her compatriot Roni Sasaki, gold medal and Sarah Billmeier, the silver medal). She also  finished in 4th place in the downhill; behind the Americans Sarah Billmeier, Cathy Gentile-Patti and Roni Sasaki.

References 

Living people
Year of birth missing (living people)
Place of birth missing (living people)
Austrian female alpine skiers
Alpine skiers at the 1988 Winter Paralympics
Alpine skiers at the 1992 Winter Paralympics
Paralympic medalists in alpine skiing
Paralympic alpine skiers of Austria
Paralympic gold medalists for Austria
Paralympic silver medalists for Austria
Paralympic bronze medalists for Austria